The 2009 ARCA Re/MAX Series was the 57th season of the ARCA Racing Series. The season began on February 7 with the Lucas Oil Slick Mist 200 and ended on October 11 with the Rockingham ARCA 200. Justin Lofton of Eddie Sharp Racing won the season championship.

This season's championship result was the closest in ARCA history, as Lofton won the title over Kligerman by a mere five points. Although Kligerman won an astounding nine races that season, Lofton (who won six races) was able to barely beat him, mainly on the strength of earning bonus points for winning poles. Lofton won five poles that year while Kligerman won zero.

Schedule
The series' 2009 schedule was announced by ARCA on October 30, 2008.

Results and standings

Races

Standings

Full Drivers' Championship
(key) Bold – Pole position awarded by time. Italics – Pole position set by final practice results or rainout. * – Most laps led.

References

ARCA Menards Series seasons
ARCA